Bracalba is a rural locality in the Moreton Bay Region, Queensland, Australia.

Geography 
A large portion of the northern half of Bracalba lies within Beerburrum West State Forest.

History 
The name is derived from the Wakawaka language, and refers to the scrub areas of the D'Aguilar Range.  

Ferndale Provisional School opened on 19 April 1892. On 1 January 1909 it became Ferndale State School. In 1913 it was renamed Bracalba State School. It  closed in 1941.

References

Suburbs of Moreton Bay Region
Localities in Queensland